Vance County Public Schools is a school district in Vance County, North Carolina, United States. The superintendent is Dr. Cindy W. Bennett. She began her tenure as Superintendent on July 1, 2021. The school district has 16 schools: 9 traditional elementary schools, 1 year-round elementary, 2 middle schools, 2 high schools (both early start calendars), as well as a K-12 virtual school and a 6-12 flex school. 

Vance County Schools is located in Henderson, NC and serves over 5,000 students.

Schools
It operates the following schools:
Aycock Elementary School
Carver Elementary School
Clarke Elementary School
Dabney Elementary School
E. M. Rollins STEAM Academy
E.O. Young Elementary School
L.B. Yancey Elementary School
New Hope Elementary School
Pinkston Street Elementary School
Zeb Vance Elementary School
Vance County Early College High School
Vance County Middle School
Vance County High School
AdVance Academy
 Vance Virtual Village Academy

External links

Education in Vance County, North Carolina
School districts in North Carolina